The West Central Texas Council of Governments (WCTCOG) is a voluntary association of cities, counties and special districts in West Central Texas.

Based in Abilene, the West Central Texas Council of Governments is a member of the Texas Association of Regional Councils.

Counties served

Largest cities in the region
Abilene
Brownwood
Snyder
Sweetwater
Breckenridge
Coleman
Ballinger
Colorado City
Comanche

References

External links
West Central Texas Council of Governments - Official site.

Texas Association of Regional Councils